Santa Colomba may refer to:

 Santa Colomba, Bientina, a village in Tuscany, Italy
 Santa Colomba, Monteriggioni, a village in Tuscany, Italy
 Villa Santa Colomba, Santa Colomba, Monetriggioni
 Stadio Santa Colomba, former name of Stadio Ciro Vigorito, a multi-use stadium in Benevento, Italy

See also
 Santa Colomba de Curueño, a municipality in the province of León, Castile and León, Spain
 Santa Colomba de las Monjas, a municipality in the province of Zamora, Castile and León, Spain
 Santa Cristina de la Polvorosa, a municipality in the province of Zamora, Castile and León, Spain
 Santa Colomba de Somoza, a municipality in the province of León, Castile and León, Spain